Leander is a given name.  The most famous bearer of the name is mythological, from the story of Hero and Leander.

People named Leander include:
 Leander of Seville (c. 534–600 or 601), Catholic saint and bishop who converted the son of the Visigothic king from Arianism
 Leander Babcock (1811–64), United States Representative from New York
 Leander Clark (1823–1910), American businessman, politician and Union Army officer during the American Civil War
 Leander Cox (1812–65), United States Representative from Kentucky
 Leander Czerny (1859–1944), Czech entomologist
Leander Dendoncker (born 1995), Belgian footballer
 Leander Ditscheiner (1839–1905), Austrian physicist and mathematician
 Leander F. Frisby (1825–89), American politician, lawyer and Wisconsin Attorney General
 Leander Haußmann (born 1959), German theatre and film director
 Leander Starr Jameson (1853–1917), British colonial statesman best known for the Jameson Raid on the Transvaal Republic in Africa
 Leander Jordan (born 1977), American National Football League offensive tackle
 Leander Kahney (born 1965), American journalist and author
 Leander J. McCormick 1819–1900), American inventor, manufacturer, philanthropist and businessman
 L. Hamilton McCormick (1859–1934), American author, inventor, art collector and sculptor, son of the above
 Leander H. McNelly (1844–1877), Confederate officer and Texas Ranger captain
 Leander Paes (born 1973), Indian tennis player
 Leander Perez (1891–1969), American Democratic Party political boss in Louisiana
 Leander Richardson (1856–1918), American journalist, playwright and theatrical writer
 Leander J. Talbott (1849–1924), American realtor and politician, former mayor of Kansas City, Missouri
 Lee Talbott (Leander James Talbott, Jr.) (1887–1954), American track and field athlete
 Leander Tomarkin (1895–1967), Swiss imposter who claimed to have invented a miracle medicine
 Leander Watts, author of young adult literature

Fictional characters include:
 Leander Sydnor, in the television series The Wire
 Leander Wapshot, in the novel The Wapshot Chronicle and its sequel by John Cheever

See also
 Leander (surname)
 Leandro, the equivalent form in Castilian and Portuguese